The 1958 Kentucky Wildcats football team represented the University of Kentucky in the 1958 NCAA University Division football season. The Wildcats scored 136 points while allowing 115 points, and finished with a record of 5–4–1.

Season
Kentucky opened with a 51–0 win over Hawaii at Cardinal Stadium in Louisville.  A 13–0 win in the SEC opener against Georgia Tech followed.  2–0 Kentucky, then ranked #17 in the AP poll, then lost four games in a row: 27–6 to #9 Ole Miss in Memphis, 8–0 to #1 Auburn,  32–7 at #9 LSU and 28–0 at Georgia.  A 33–12 win over Mississippi State was followed by a 0–0 tie against Vanderbilt. After a 20–6 win against Xavier, Kentucky closed the season with a 6–2 victory at Tennessee.

The victory over Tennessee was Kentucky's second in a row, and second in a stretch of four games in which Kentucky denied Tennessee a win. The Wildcats were invited to participate in the 1958 Bluegrass Bowl but declined due to what they considered to be poor treatment during their season opener, a win against Hawaii in the stadium in which the Bluegrass Bowl would be played.  Florida State and Oklahoma State played in the 1958 Bluegrass Bowl instead.

Schedule

Schedule source:

Team players in the 1959 NFL Draft

References

Kentucky
Kentucky Wildcats football seasons
Kentucky Wildcats football